Surry Power Station is a nuclear power plant located in Surry County in southeastern Virginia, in the South Atlantic United States. The power station lies on an  site adjacent to the James River across from Jamestown, slightly upriver from Smithfield and Newport News. Surry is operated by Dominion Generation and owned by Dominion Resources, Inc.

The Surry plant is similar in appearance and design to its "sister plant" North Anna Power Station, located northwest of Richmond in Louisa County, Virginia.

History
The plant has two 3-loop Westinghouse pressurized water reactors that went on-line in 1972 and 1973 respectively. Each reactor produces approximately 800 megawatts of power, for a combined plant output of 1.6 gigawatts. Surry Power Station draws its condenser cycle water directly from the James River, removing the need for the imposing cooling towers often associated with nuclear plants. Repeated testing shows that Surry  Power Station has minimal environmental impact and releases virtually no radiation or harmful emissions.

The station site was originally designed for four units; however, only two reactors were built. With increasing energy demands in the United States, it is possible that more reactors will be built at Surry in the next few decades.

In 2003, the Nuclear Regulatory Commission (NRC) extended the operating licenses for both reactors from forty to sixty years. In 2016 its owner announced it intended in due course to seek an extension to eighty years of operation, to 2052 and 2053. This extension to 80 years was obtained in 2021.

Surry was one of the plants analyzed in the NUREG-1150 safety analysis study.

Electricity Production

Surrounding population

The 2010 U.S. population within  of Surry was 127,041, an increase of 21.9 percent in a decade, according to an analysis of U.S. Census data for msnbc.com. The 2010 U.S. population within  was 2,292,642, an increase of 13.9 percent since 2000. Cities within 50 miles include Hopewell, Petersburg, Williamsburg, Newport News, Hampton, Poquoson, Portsmouth, Norfolk (30 miles to city center), Virginia Beach (47 miles to city center), and Richmond (50 miles to city center).

Events 
• On July 27, 1972, two workers were fatally scalded after a routine valve adjustment led to a steam release in a gap in a vent line.

• On May 8, 1979, FBI agents investigated a white crystalline substance that had been poured into 62 fresh fuels elements kept in storage at the plant, a day after plant officials made the discovery. Westinghouse metallurgists found no damage to the fuel elements, including the metal containers and zirconium rods holding the fresh fuel.

• On December 9, 1986, a steam explosion (condensate feed piping ruptured due to internal erosion and over-pressurization when feed pump check valve failed) in the non-nuclear part of Unit 2 injured eight workers. Four later died.

• On April 16, 2011, a tornado touched down in the plant's electrical switching station, disabling primary power to the plant's cooling pumps and causing the backup diesel generators to activate without incident.

• On August 23, 2011, an earthquake in central Virginia automatically shut down Dominion's North Anna reactors 11 miles from the epicenter.  The similar Surry reactors continued in operation and Dominion declared a "Notice of Unusual Event" (the least dangerous of a four-level emergency scale) for the Surry plant which was lifted later the same day.

Seismic risk
The Nuclear Regulatory Commission's estimate of the risk each year of an earthquake intense enough to cause core damage to the reactor at Surry was 1 in 175,439, according to an NRC study published in August 2010.

References

External links

Dominion's nuclear page

Energy infrastructure completed in 1972
Energy infrastructure completed in 1973
Buildings and structures in Surry County, Virginia
Nuclear power plants in Virginia
Nuclear power stations using pressurized water reactors